The Limerick Tunnel is a , twin bore road tunnel underneath the River Shannon on the outskirts of Limerick city. The tunnel forms part of the N18 Limerick Southern Ring Road. The tunnel is tolled.

Construction
Construction was carried out by a consortium of Strabag, John Sisk & Son Ltd, Lagan Holdings Ltd and Roadbridge Ltd. Traffic and Transportation planning was undertaken by Colin Buchannan and Partners. Dredging work for the tunnel trench was carried out by Dutch company Van Oord. The immersion process of floating the tunnel elements out into the Shannon was carried out by another Dutch company, Mergor.

The total cost of construction was €660 million.

Opening

A pedestrian open day was held on 19 June 2010, with official opening to traffic by the Taoiseach, Brian Cowen, on 27 July 2010, two months ahead of schedule.

Tolling
The Austrian EFKON Group commissioned, built and currently operate two toll collection locations, one ten-lane and one six-lane plaza, both manned.

The tolling locations are both north of the Shannon. One is between junctions 3 and 4 of the N18, and the other is between N18 junction 3 and the Clonmacken Roundabout.

See also
Jack Lynch Tunnel, on the N40 southern ring road of Cork 
Dublin Port Tunnel
Atlantic Corridor, ongoing construction of major roads along the west side of Ireland 
Roads in Ireland

References

Road tunnels in the Republic of Ireland
Buildings and structures in Limerick (city)
Roads in County Limerick
Tunnels completed in 2010
River Shannon
Toll tunnels in Europe
Immersed tube tunnels in Ireland